is a Japanese animator and character designer. He has worked on several anime films from the 1960s and 1970s, on the Super Mario video game series, and the Pokémon series in television and film. He was an employee at Nintendo for two decades doing illustrations, character designs, and supervision from 1985 to 2007. At that time, he began to work as a freelancer for the anime and video game industry, including for Nintendo again.

Biography
Kotabe became interested in animation after watching the short film Momotarō no Umiwashi as a child. He was fascinated with how the fighter moved in the film. His father, who was an oil painter, also influenced his decision to work as an artist. Kotabe found oil painting to be difficult, so he instead worked in watercolor painting.

In order to continue working in watercolors, he adopted the nihonga, or Japanese‐style, of painting, and began studying at the Tokyo University of the Arts in the Japanese‐style painting department. While attending, he was impressed by the film The Tale of the White Serpent and the animator Yasuji Mori, and immediately applied to work at Toei Animation.

His first project there was Hols: Prince of the Sun where he met Hayao Miyazaki and Isao Takahata. He left Toei amid a labor dispute along with Miyazaki and Takahata in order to work at A Pro, and they began work on an adaptation of Pippi Longstocking. That project was eventually canceled, and work began on the two-film series Panda! Go, Panda!.

Kotabe then worked as character designer on two anime television series from Nippon Animation: Heidi, Girl of the Alps, and 3000 Leagues in Search of Mother, with Miyazaki working on scene design and layout and Takahata working as series director and storyboard artist.

In 1985, he was scouted by Nintendo and assumed the position of the game development advisor where he created package illustrations for Super Mario Bros. This was his introduction to video games. He left Nintendo in 2007, although he had originally only intended to stay in the company for one or two years at most.

Works

Awards and nominations
 Animator/Animation Director award, Tokyo Anime Fair 6th Annual Awards of Merit, 2009.
 Special Achievement award, 19th Japan Media Arts Festival Awards, 2015.

References

External links
 
 Yoichi Kotabe anime at Media Arts Database 

Japanese animators
Japanese animated film directors
Japanese video game designers
Anime character designers
1936 births
Nintendo people
Living people
Tokyo University of the Arts alumni
Toei Animation